Potraga za zmajem is a Croatian film directed by Jane Kavčič. It was released in 1961.

External links
 

1961 films
Croatian war drama films
1960s Croatian-language films
Yugoslav war drama films
Jadran Film films
Yugoslav World War II films